Ollainville is the name of two communes in France:
 Ollainville, Vosges
 Ollainville, Essonne